The Indian locomotive class WCM-1 is a class of 1.5 kV DC electric locomotives that was developed in 1954 by Vulcan Foundry and English Electric for Indian Railways. The model name stands for broad gauge (W), Direct Current (C), Mixed traffic (M) engine, 1st generation (1). They entered service in 1955. A total of 7 WCM-1 locomotives were built in England between 1954 and 1955.

The WCM-1 served both passenger and freight trains for over 45 years. With the introduction of more modern types of locomotives and 25 KV AC electrification, all were withdrawn by the early 2000s after repeated failures. Today 1 locomotive is preserved with rest of the units being Scrapped.

History 

The history of WCM-1 begins in the mid 1950s with the stated aim of the Indian Railways (IR) to remove the aging fleet of WCP-1, WCP-2, WCP-3 and WCP-4 class locomotives working on the Central Railway (CR) . So IR to procure 7 1500 V DC electric locomotives from English Electric and Vulcan Foundry, the latter previously supplied Steam locomotives to India. They are manufactured in England and shipped to India in 1954-1955.

These locomotives were the first mixed class electric locomotive to roam India as well as the first electric locomotive with now common Co-Co wheel arrangement. They were also the longest serving non steam locomotives in India until the arrival of the WCG-2, WCAM-1, WCAM-2, WCM-6, WCAM-3 and WCAG-1 class. Initially the WCM-1 class were known as EM/1 class. They were easily recognizable with their huge size and round smooth noses. They had their cab doors placed in the middle of the body instead of being near the cab.

The WCM-1 locomotives were used on many Express trains like the Deccan Queen, Indrayani Express and as well as on Freight Duties. In 1968, the placement of the entry doors were moved to near the cab for better practicality. The Deccan Queen had WCM-1 with a matching livery until 1990s. In the mid 1990s the aging WCM-1s began to fail regularly causing disruption on train services. So Central Railways decided to withdraw these locomotives from service and by 2000, all units were withdrawn with only 1 unit preserved.

Preserved Examples

Former sheds 

 Pune
 Kalyan (KYN)
  All the locomotives of this class has been withdrawn from service.

See also

Rail transport in India#History
Indian Railways
Locomotives of India
Rail transport in India

References

External links

http://www.irfca.org/faq/faq-specs.html#WCM-1

India railway fan club

Electric locomotives of India
1500 V DC locomotives
Co-Co locomotives
Railway locomotives introduced in 1955
5 ft 6 in gauge locomotives
English Electric locomotives